The 2018 AFC Women's Futsal Championship was the second edition of the AFC Women's Futsal Championship, the biennial international futsal championship organized by the Asian Football Confederation (AFC) for the women's national teams of Asia. It took place in Thailand, which was appointed as hosts by the AFC on 29 July 2017, between 2 and 12 May 2018. The tournament was originally to be held between 15–26 August 2017, two years after the inaugural edition in 2015, but was postponed to the following year.

A total of 15 teams participated in the tournament. The 15 teams were divided into four groups (one with three teams and three with four teams), with the group winners and the best runner-up advancing to the quarter-finals.

The tournament served as qualifying for the futsal tournament at the 2018 Summer Youth Olympics in Buenos Aires, with the winner and the runner-up qualifying for the girls' tournament, to be represented by their under-18 representative teams.

Iran, the defending champions, won their second title in a row.

Qualified teams
Of the 47 AFC member associations, a total of 15 teams entered the competition. There was no qualification, and all entrants advanced to the final tournament.

Venues
The matches are played at the Bangkok Arena and Indoor Stadium Huamark in Bangkok.

Draw
The final draw was held on 5 March 2018, 15:30 MYT (UTC+8), at the AFC House in Kuala Lumpur. The 15 teams were drawn into three group of four teams (Groups A, B and C) and one group of three teams (Group D). The teams were seeded according to their performance in the 2015 AFC Women's Futsal Championship tournament, with the hosts Thailand automatically seeded and assigned to Position A1 in the draw.

Squads

Each team must register a squad of 14 players, minimum two of whom must be goalkeepers (Regulations Articles 27.1 and 27.2).

Group stage
The winner of each group and the best runner-up advance to the semi-finals.

Tiebreakers
Teams are ranked according to points (3 points for a win, 1 point for a draw, 0 points for a loss), and if tied on points, the following tiebreaking criteria are applied, in the order given, to determine the rankings (Regulations Article 10.5):
Points in head-to-head matches among tied teams;
Goal difference in head-to-head matches among tied teams;
Goals scored in head-to-head matches among tied teams;
If more than two teams are tied, and after applying all head-to-head criteria above, a subset of teams are still tied, all head-to-head criteria above are reapplied exclusively to this subset of teams;
Goal difference in all group matches;
Goals scored in all group matches;
Penalty shoot-out if only two teams are tied and they met in the last round of the group;
Disciplinary points (yellow card = 1 point, red card as a result of two yellow cards = 3 points, direct red card = 3 points, yellow card followed by direct red card = 4 points);
Drawing of lots.

All times are local, ICT (UTC+7).

Group A

Group B

Group C

Group D

Knockout stage
In the knockout stage, extra time and penalty shoot-out are used to decide the winner if necessary, except for the third place match where penalty shoot-out (no extra time) is used to decide the winner if necessary (Regulations Articles 14.1 and 15.1).

Bracket

Quarter-finals

Semi-finals
Winners qualify for 2018 Summer Youth Olympics girls' futsal tournament, to be represented by their under-18 representative teams.

Third place match

Final

Winners

Qualified teams for Youth Olympics
The following two teams from AFC qualified for the 2018 Summer Youth Olympics girls' futsal tournament. Since Iran also qualified for the 2018 Summer Youth Olympics boys' futsal tournament and chose the boys' tournament over the girls' tournament, they were replaced by Thailand.

Notes
Since teams from the same association cannot play in both the Youth Olympics boys' and girls' tournaments, if teams from the same association qualify for both tournaments, they must nominate their preferred qualification team, and the next best ranked team will qualify instead if one of the qualified teams are not nominated.
As participation in team sports (Futsal, Beach handball, Field hockey, and Rugby sevens) are limited to one team per gender for each National Olympic Committee (NOC), the participating teams of the 2018 Youth Olympics futsal tournament will be confirmed by mid-2018 after each qualified NOC confirms their participation and any unused qualification places are reallocated.

Awards
The following awards were given at the conclusion of the tournament:

Goalscorers

Tournament team rankings

See also
2017 AFC U-20 Futsal Championship
Futsal at the 2018 Summer Youth Olympics

References

External links
, the-AFC.com
AFC Women's Futsal Championship 2018, stats.the-AFC.com

2018
Women's Futsal Championship
Afc Girls
International futsal competitions hosted by Thailand
2018 in Thai football
Sport in Bangkok
May 2018 sports events in Asia